Oosoma is a genus of beetles in the family Carabidae, containing the following species:

 Oosoma gyllenhalii (Dejean, 1829)
 Oosoma semivittatum (Fabricius, 1798)

References

Harpalinae